Robert Bierenbaum (born July 22, 1955) is an American former plastic surgeon and convicted murderer. He was convicted in October 2000 of having murdered his estranged wife, Gail Katz-Bierenbaum 15 years earlier in their Manhattan apartment on July 7, 1985.

Bierenbaum, a licensed pilot, took a two-hour flight in a Cessna 172 from Essex County, New Jersey over the Atlantic Ocean on the day he murdered Gail. He failed to mention this fact to authorities during their initial questioning.

The prosecution stated that Bierenbaum discarded his wife's dismembered body in the ocean. The victim's torso was first thought to be found in 1989 but after exhuming the torso, DNA testing in 1999 proved it was not  that of Gail Katz-Bierenbaum. Despite eyewitness testimony for the defense who stated he saw the victim in a Manhattan bagel shop during the time that Bierenbaum took his airplane flight, Bierenbaum was convicted and sentenced to twenty years to life in prison in New York. He appealed, but the conviction was upheld in the New York State Supreme Court, Appellate Division in 2002.

Bierenbaum is currently incarcerated in Sing Sing Correctional Facility. He has been eligible for parole since October 2020. His offender number is 00-A-7114. 

At his December 2020 parole hearing, Bierenbaum confessed that he had killed his wife and threw her body out of an airplane.

Notoriety
The Bierenbaum case was the subject of the 2001 New York Times non-fiction bestseller book The Surgeon's Wife. It was the basis of the plot of the episode "The Good Doctor" in the first season of Law and Order: Criminal Intent and also one of the stories in the television show Dominick Dunne: Power, Privilege, & Justice on Court TV.

In the ISBN database, the summary of the book includes:

Bierenbaum has been referred to as "The Lady Killer". It has been said in Vanity Fair and New York magazine that women still find him attractive, even though he has been convicted of murdering his first wife.

Legal precedent
People of the State of New York v. Robert Bierenbaum was a landmark decision, setting precedent on upholding physician-patient privilege even when a Tarasoff warning is invoked: "Neither a psychiatrist issuing a Tarasoff warning nor a patient telling his friends he's in treatment constitutes a waiver of a patient's psychiatrist-patient privilege."

The case was also used as precedent in the California case of Glyn Scharf, where Scharf was charged with murdering his wife, even though the victim's body was never found.

Confession 
At a parole hearing in December 2020, Bierenbaum confessed to strangling his wife and tossing her body out of an airplane while flying over the Atlantic Ocean. The hearing denied his parole. His next parole hearing was scheduled for November 2021.

Medical practice status
As a result of the New York state Medical Licensing Board's misconduct review following the court case, Bierenbaum surrendered his License to Practice medicine in November, 2000. In September 2002, New Jersey also revoked his medical practice license.

In popular culture
The Robert Bierenbaum case was featured by the television show Law and Order: Criminal Intent, in an episode entitled "The Good Doctor", which originally aired in November, 2001; in an episode of the French series Paris enquêtes criminelles; and in an episode of 20/20 in October 2021.

Lisa DePaulo profiled the Bierenbaum case in her story, "Intimations of Murder" published in the September 2000 issue of Vanity Fair magazine. The case was featured in an episode of OWN series Devil You Know.

References

External links
"A man claims he saw surgeon’s wife the day she disappeared"
"Patient Confidentiality at Issue in 1985 Murder Case"
"Dr. Bierenbaum's Missing Wife"(Crime Library)
Las Vegas Review Journal Nov. 30, 2000
Las Vegas Review Journal Nov. 25, 2000

American people convicted of murder
Prisoners and detainees of New York (state)
People convicted of murder by New York (state)
American plastic surgeons
Living people
Murder convictions without a body
Place of birth missing (living people)
1955 births